Peter Gilbert Greenall, 4th Baron Daresbury  (born 8 July 1953) is a British aristocrat and businessman associated primarily with horseracing, notably as the chairman of Aintree Racecourse from 1989-2014.

Life and career
Greenall was born on 8 July 1953 in Marylebone, London, the eldest son of Edward Gilbert Greenall, 3rd Baron Daresbury.  He was schooled at Eton College before attending Magdalene College, Cambridge and later the London Business School. From 1982 he was a director, and from 1992-1997 managing director, of the family business, Greenall's, as it evolved
from a diversified brewery into De Vere; after serving as chief executive from 1997 and chairman from 2000, he left DeVere in 2006 when the company was sold.

Upon the death of his father on 9 September 1996 Greenall succeeded to the peerage as the 4th Baron Daresbury, also inheriting as 5th Baronet Greenall, of Walton, Chester. He therefore became a member of the House of Lords, the upper chamber of the British Parliament, sitting as a hereditary peer. Lord Daresbury was removed from the House with the passage and commencement of the House of Lords Act 1999, which removed the right of all but ninety-two hereditary peers to sit; Daresbury was not one of the remaining minority.

A keen horseracing enthusiast, and himself a rider, Daresbury was appointed to the chairmanship of Aintree, home of the Grand National, Britain's richest horserace, in 1989 at the age of 35. Under his stewardship prize money for the race rose from £118,000 to £1,000,000.  All four of his sons have also been jockeys. He retired in 2014.

The Lord Daresbury Stand at Aintree is named in his honour.

He is a Deputy Lieutenant of County of Cheshire.

Arms

References

British businesspeople
Barons in the Peerage of the United Kingdom
Deputy Lieutenants of Cheshire
Living people
1953 births
Peter
British jockeys
Horse racing administrators
People educated at Eton College
Alumni of Magdalene College, Cambridge
Alumni of London Business School
High Sheriffs of Cheshire
Daresbury